Boulevards in Omaha are part of a park and boulevard system originally designed in 1889 by Horace Cleveland.

The park-and-boulevard system is listed in the National Register of Historic Places.

History
In 1889 Horace W.S. Cleveland proposed that the city of Omaha develop a series of "broad ornamental avenues, known as boulevards or parkways" designed "with a tasteful arrangement of trees and shrubbery at the sides and in the center", similar to the comprehensive plans of European cities in the mid-19th century. His plan was accepted by the city's Parks Commission, resulting in the construction of Florence Boulevard, then called "Omaha's Prettiest Mile Boulevard", in 1892.

Omaha's early boulevard system was viewed as an extension of the parks system in the early park of the 20th century. Florence Boulevard was the first link; the second was Hanscom Boulevard, which was designed to connect the city's first two park, Hanscom Park, with its second, Riverview Park. Happy Hollow, Fontenelle and Turner Boulevards followed. The development of Lincoln Boulevard in Bemis Park was credited with the rapid growth of that subdivision in the early 20th century. A large segment of that boulevard was demolished during the construction of Interstate 480 in the early 1960s, and only a small segment remains.

The boulevard system originally weaved North Omaha, Midtown Omaha and South Omaha together, with sections traveling to Dundee, Gifford Park, Field Club and Benson. Plantings, tree-lined drives and smooth roadways throughout the city were treated with park-like value. A 1915 plan epitomized this ideal by calling for a riverfront boulevard that weaved the entire length of the Missouri River through Omaha. The northern section, called J.J. Pershing Drive, was finished by 1920; Gifford Drive in South Omaha was designed to do the same. However, influential Omaha architect John Latenser was adamant about preventing this project from coming to fruition in Downtown Omaha, where he saw the boulevard potentially impeding on his plans for the Port of Omaha. Because of his resistance this early "back to the river" plan did not succeed.

In the 1930s the city pushed to reconstruct its boulevard system, and received forty percent of the revenue from its wheel tax to do that. In 1934 the WPA completed work on the Saddle Creek Underpass, which took what was then the westernmost addition to the system under Dodge Street. Today Saddle Creek Boulevard is called Saddle Creek Road.

The late 1940s construction of the Deer Park Boulevard leading to the new Johnny Rosenblatt stadium on that street is credited with giving John Rosenblatt the political ability to become the mayor of Omaha. Abbott Drive was built by Eppley Airfield during this period, too, becoming the easternmost link in Omaha's boulevard system.

Present
The Sorensen Parkway is a modern version of the historic boulevard system that was built in the 1880s.

In the early first decade of the 21st century a plan was adopted by the city of Omaha to introduce more boulevards throughout the suburbs of Omaha. The Revised Suburban Parks Master Plan identifies two types of boulevard as the "Grand Boulevard", which is designed as Cleveland originally conceptualized it, and the "Parkway" style. The Grand Boulevard is characterized by wide lanes, planting medians in between roadways, and limited access through narrow driveways and side streets. The Parkway features a faster speed limit, broad, tree-lined roadways and limited residential access. Both have large trees with broad canopies. Lighting, roundabouts, signage and concrete types are all also considerations. The boulevard system is also included in the city of Omaha's Green Streets Master Plan.

See also
List of streets in Omaha, Nebraska
 History of Omaha

References

External links

 City of Omaha Planning Department. (1992) Omaha's Historic Park and Boulevard System.
 "A History of Boulevards in North Omaha" by Adam Fletcher Sasse for NorthOmahaHistory.com

Omaha
Roads on the National Register of Historic Places in Nebraska
National Register of Historic Places in Omaha, Nebraska